Banff Airport  is located  northeast of Banff, Alberta, Canada. It is operated by Parks Canada, as it is located within Banff National Park.

After about ten years of being closed, the airstrip was reopened in 2007. Local environmentalists criticized the decision, saying that the decade of closure had had positive effects on local wildlife. The airstrip is only used for emergency and diversionary landings.

References

External links
 
 Page about this airport on COPA's Places to Fly airport directory

Registered aerodromes in Alberta
Banff, Alberta
Banff National Park